Deborah Lynn Scott (born 1954), also known as Deborah Scott is a costume designer and set designer, best known for her work in James Cameron's directorial venture Titanic which won her the Academy Award for Best Costume Design.

Her first movie as a costume designer was Don't Answer the Phone (1979). Some of her other movies are E.T. the Extra-Terrestrial (1982), Back to the Future (1985), Legends of the Fall (1994), Wild Wild West (1999), The Patriot (2000), Transformers (2007), Avatar (2009), and Love & Other Drugs (2010).

Personal life
She has completed her education from California State University, Northridge, California. She has two daughters, Hannah and Tess.

Filmography

 Avatar: The Way of Water (2022)
 Sicario: Day of the Soldado (2018)
 Rebel in the Rye (2017)
 13 Hours: The Secret Soldiers of Benghazi (2016)
 Aloha (2015)
 Rock the Kasbah (2015)
 The Amazing Spider-Man 2 (2014)
 We Bought A Zoo (2011)
 Transformers: Dark of the Moon (2011)
 Love & Other Drugs (2010)
 Avatar (2009)
 Transformers: Revenge of the Fallen (2009)
 The Invention of Lying (2009)
 Get Smart (2008)
 Reign Over Me (2007)
 Seraphim Falls (2007)
 Transformers (2007)
 The Lost City (2005)
 The Island (2005)
 The Upside of Anger (2005)
 Bad Boys II (2003)
 The Hebrew Hammer (2003)
 Minority Report (2002)
 The Patriot (2000)
 Wild Wild West (1999)
 Titanic (1997)
 To Gillian on Her 37th Birthday (1996)
 Heat (1995)
 The Indian in the Cupboard (1995)
 Legends of the Fall (1994)
 Jack the Bear (1993)
 Sliver (1993)
 Hoffa (1992)
 The Turn of the Screw (1992)
 Defending Your Life (1991)
 Eve of Destruction (1991)
 Hear My Song (1991)
 Coupe de Ville (1990)
 When the Whales Came (1989)
 Moving (1988)
 Who's That Girl (1987)
 About Last Night... (1986)
 Armed and Dangerous (1986)
 Blue City (1986)
 Back to the Future (1985)
 Streets of Fire (1984)
 Never Cry Wolf (1983)
 Kiss My Grits (1983)
 Twilight Zone: The Movie (1983)
 E.T. the Extra-Terrestrial (1982)
 The Private Eyes (1980)
 Don't Answer the Phone (1979)

She has also worked as Assistant costume designer in Shakespeare in Love (1998) and The Young Victoria (2009), as Set designer in Alouette, je te plumerai (1989), and Midsummer, Nat Horne Theatre, New York City, (1990).

References

External links

1954 births
Living people
American costume designers
Best Costume Design Academy Award winners
California State University, Northridge alumni
Women costume designers